Blueberry Cave is the fourth album and second studio album by United States-based fusion band Garaj Mahal.

Reception
Blueberry Cave was well received and won the "Best Jam Album" award at the 6th Annual Independent Music Awards in 2007.

Track listing

Personnel

Fareed Haque – guitar
Alan Hertz – drums
Eric Levy – keyboards
Kai Eckhardt – bass

References

Garaj Mahal albums
2005 albums